Although British gymnasts competed at numerous Olympic Games as early as 1908, they did not compete at a World Championships until 1966.  Neil Thomas won Great Britain's first world medal, a silver on floor exercise, at the 1993 World Championships.  At the 2015 World Championships both men and women won their first team medals, a silver and bronze respectively.

Medalists

Medal tables

By gender

By event

Junior World medalists

See also 
 Great Britain men's national artistic gymnastics team
 Great Britain women's national artistic gymnastics team
 List of Olympic female artistic gymnasts for Great Britain

References 

World Artistic Gymnastics Championships
Gymnastics in England